Mansour bin Attia bin Mohammed Al-Mazrouei (born 30 April 1967) has been a Member of the Consultative Assembly of Saudi Arabia since 2021.

He holds a bachelor's and master's degree in meteorology from King Abdulaziz University, and completed his PhD in climate change at the University of East Anglia in 2006.

References

1967 births
Living people
King Abdulaziz University alumni
Alumni of the University of East Anglia
Members of the Consultative Assembly of Saudi Arabia